Mexico–Switzerland relations are the diplomatic relations between Mexico and Switzerland. Both nations are members of the Organisation for Economic Co-operation and Development and the United Nations.

History 
Official contact between Mexico and Switzerland was established in 1827. That same year, Switzerland opened a diplomatic office in Mexico City. In 1832, both nations signed a treaty of Friendship and Commerce and Mexico opened a diplomatic office in Basel. In 1945, both nations officially established diplomatic relations and in 1946, Mexico opened a diplomatic office in Bern. In 1958, both nations elevated their diplomatic missions to embassies.

Switzerland maintains a high-level international profile due to it hosting several UN agencies and other international organizations in Geneva. Each year, the World Economic Forum is held in Davos and high-level Mexican officials, including the Mexican President; travel to Switzerland to meet with Swiss politicians and business persons.

In 2018, approximately 5,219 Swiss citizens resided in Mexico. In 2021, both nations celebrated 75 years of diplomatic relations.

High-level visits

High-level visits from Mexico to Switzerland

 President Carlos Salinas de Gortari (1990)
 President Ernesto Zedillo (1998)
 President Vicente Fox (2001, 2003, 2004)
 President Felipe Calderón (2007, 2009, 2010, 2011)
 President Enrique Peña Nieto (2014)

High-level visits from Switzerland to Mexico

 Foreign Minister Pierre Aubert (1984)
 Foreign Minister René Felber (1989)
 Economic Minister Jean-Pascal Delamuraz (1995)
 Economic Minister Pascal Couchepin (1998, 2000)
 President Joseph Deiss (2004)
 President Johann Schneider-Ammann (2013, 2016)

Bilateral agreements
Both nations have signed several bilateral agreements such as an Agreement on Air Transportation (1966); Agreement on the Avoidance of Double-Taxation and Tax Evasion (1994); Agreement on the Promotion and Reciprocal Protection of Investments (1995); Agreement on Mutual Administrative Assistance in Customs Matters (2008); Memorandum of Understanding on the Cooperation between the Mexican Agency of International Cooperation for Development (AMEXCID) and the Swiss Agency for Development and Cooperation (2013); Memorandum of Understanding in Health Cooperation (2016) and an Agreement of Cinematographic Cooperation (2017).

Education
Colegio Suizo de México, a Swiss international primary and secondary school in Mexico catering to expatriate Swiss families; has campuses in Cuernavaca, Mexico City, and Querétaro City.

Transportation
There are direct flights between Cancún and Zürich with Edelweiss Air.

Trade relations 
In 2001, Mexico signed a free trade agreement with the European Free Trade Association which includes Iceland, Liechtenstein, Norway and Switzerland. In 2019, two-way trade between Mexico and Switzerland amounted to US$2 billion. Between 1999 and 2016, Swiss companies invested more than US$9 billion in Mexico. Several Swiss multi-national companies are based and operate in Mexico, such as Credit Suisse, Holcim, Nestlé, Novartis and UBS. Mexican multinational companies such as Cemex and Vitro operate in Switzerland.

Resident diplomatic missions 
 Mexico has an embassy in Bern.
 Switzerland has an embassy in Mexico City.

Notes and references 

 
Switzerland
Bilateral relations of Switzerland